Sex report films (German: Report-Filme) were pseudo-documentaries that had sexual life as their subject matter. Effectively sexploitation films, the genre was particularly popular in the early 1970s Europe.

Background
Mostly a German (or Germanophone) phenomenon, these films followed the wake of the Kinsey and Masters and Johnson type reports as well as maintaining elements from the German-speaking educational films (Aufklärungsfilme) tradition. Producers Erwin C. Dietrich (particularly in the late 1960s) and Wolf C. Hartwig were active in the genre: the latter produced the Schulmädchen-Report films, which may be considered a subgenre on their own.

After Schulmädchen-Report
The success of the Schulmädchen-Report: Was Eltern nicht für möglich halten in 1970 triggered a range of new films that had titles ending with the word -Report per norm, which ostensibly focused on certain populations and gradually lost their pseudo-documentary tone. Hausfrauen-Report (1971), Ehemänner-Report (1971), Lehrmädchen-Report (1972), Krankenschwestern-Report (1972), Teenager-Report (1973) were among the most distinguished specimens of the genre, where Ernst Hofbauer was exalted as a pioneering director.

References
 
 

Sexploitation films
1970s German-language films
Film genres